Mahatma Gandhi Centenary Vidhyalaya (MGCV) is an English medium co-educational school affiliated to Central Board of Secondary Education (CBSE) in Tiruchirappalli, Tamil Nadu, India, founded in 1969 honoring the birth centenary of Mahatma Gandhi by 'Vidya Seva Ratnam' K.SANTHANAM Founder - Secretary

Campus 
Mahatma Gandhi Centenary Vidhyalaya provides education from nursery to Class X. To ensure the complete development of the children, the school encourages the students to take part in various co-curricular activities held in school, including music, dance, arts, and sports.

The campus is equipped with infrastructural facilities, including classrooms, access to teaching aids, library, computer labs, science labs, and playground. Smart classes have also been installed by Educomp to provide a new method of teaching to the students.
From the year 2011, Mrs. K.Krishnaveni retired from the principal post and Mrs. Jikki Kanagavalli(English department) has been appointed as the principal of this school. A very good auditorium was also built for various events like Quizzes, Counselling Sessions etc.

References 

1. https://archive.today/20121128174051/http://164.100.50.30/SchoolDir/appview_dir.asp?affno=1930058

Primary schools in Tamil Nadu
High schools and secondary schools in Tamil Nadu
Schools in Tiruchirappalli
Educational institutions established in 1969
1969 establishments in Tamil Nadu